Mathieu Tousignant (born November 21, 1989) is a Canadian professional ice hockey player currently signed to German Oberliga side Saale Bulls Halle. Tousignant was most recently with Elite Ice Hockey League (EIHL) side Nottingham Panthers and previously played for Löwen Frankfurt of the German DEL2.

Playing career
On March 24, 2010, Tousignant was signed as an undrafted free agent by the Dallas Stars to a three-year entry-level contract. He was assigned to AHL affiliate, the Texas Stars for the majority of his tenure with the Stars.

On August 16, 2013, Tousignant signed a one-year contract as a free agent to remain in the AHL with the Milwaukee Admirals.

On July 3, 2014, Tousignant left the Admirals after one season to sign as a free agent on a one-year contract with the Adirondack Flames an affiliate of the Calgary Flames. In the 2014–15 season, Tousignant was a fixture amongst the forward group's checking line, appearing in 70 games for 5 goals and 19 points.

With the Flames relocating AHL affiliate at the conclusion of the season, Tousignant left the AHL as a free agent and signed a contract with German club., Ravensburg Towerstars of the DEL2 on August 21, 2015.

After spells with Tingsryds AIF, Löwen Frankfurt and DVTK Jegesmedvék, Tousignant signed for Nottingham Panthers of the UK Elite Ice Hockey League in January 2020.

In August 2020, Tousignant moved to Erste Liga side HSC Csíkszereda, but he returned to Nottingham ahead of the 2021-22 Elite League season.

In June 2022, Tousignant signed terms with German Oberliga side Saale Bulls Halle ahead of the 2022-23 campaign.

References

External links

1989 births
Adirondack Flames players
Baie-Comeau Drakkar players
Chicoutimi Saguenéens (QMJHL) players
Ice hockey people from Quebec
Idaho Steelheads (ECHL) players
Living people
Löwen Frankfurt players
Milwaukee Admirals players
Nottingham Panthers players
P.E.I. Rocket players
Ravensburg Towerstars players
St. John's IceCaps players
Texas Stars players
Tingsryds AIF players
DVTK Jegesmedvék players
HSC Csíkszereda players
Canadian expatriate ice hockey players in Germany
Canadian ice hockey centres
Canadian expatriate ice hockey players in Romania
Canadian expatriate ice hockey players in England
Canadian expatriate ice hockey players in the United States
Canadian expatriate ice hockey players in Sweden
Canadian expatriate ice hockey players in Hungary